Jonathan Vervoort (born 13 August 1993) is a Belgian footballer who currently plays for Rupel Boom.

References

External links

Jonathan Vervoort on Footballdatabase

1993 births
Living people
Footballers from Brussels
Association football defenders
Belgian footballers
Belgium youth international footballers
Belgium under-21 international footballers
R.S.C. Anderlecht players
FC Eindhoven players
R. Charleroi S.C. players
FC Nordsjælland players
F.C.V. Dender E.H. players
K.S.V. Roeselare players
Rovaniemen Palloseura players
K. Rupel Boom F.C. players
Eerste Divisie players
Belgian Pro League players
Danish Superliga players
Belgian expatriate footballers
Expatriate footballers in the Netherlands
Belgian expatriate sportspeople in the Netherlands
Expatriate men's footballers in Denmark
Belgian expatriate sportspeople in Denmark
Expatriate footballers in Finland
Belgian expatriate sportspeople in Finland